The Association of Vatican Lay Workers (ADLV) is the sole trade union in Vatican City.

The ADLV was formed in 1985. The first ever strike in the Vatican was organized by the ADLV in 1988. In 1992 the union organised a successful mass resignation campaign to protest against the absence of pensions for workers. Vatican authorities formally recognised the ADLV in 1993.

The ADLV is affiliated to the International Trade Union Confederation.

References

Catholic trade unions
Trade unions in Vatican City
International Trade Union Confederation
Trade unions established in 1985
Labour Office of the Apostolic See
Associations of the Christian faithful
1985 establishments in Vatican City